The Man Standing Next is a 2020 South Korean political drama film directed by Woo Min-ho. Based on an original novel of the same title, the film stars Lee Byung-hun, Lee Sung-min, Kwak Do-won, and Lee Hee-joon as the high ranking officials of the Korean government and the Korean Central Intelligence Agency (KCIA) during the presidency of Park Chung-hee 40 days before his assassination in 1979.

The film premiered in South Korea on 22 January 2020, where it topped the box office until 4 February 2020. It was released in the United States on 24 January 2020. It was selected as the South Korean entry for the Best International Feature Film at the 93rd Academy Awards, but it was not nominated. The film was released in Japan on 22 January 2021, under the name KCIA.

Synopsis
In the 1970s, Korea is under the absolute control of President Park who controls the KCIA, the organization with an edge over any branch of government. The director of the KCIA, Kim Gyu-pyeong, is nearly the second-in-command, but faces rivalry from the president's security chief. In the midst of a reign of fear, a former KCIA director, Park Yong-gak, who knows all about the government's obscure and illegal operations, goes into exile, and testifies in front of the U.S. Congress, opening the floodgates to the investigation of Koreagate. As tension escalates, stifling political maneuvers by those desiring power collide explosively.

Plot
Park Yong-gak, a former KCIA director, testifies against the South Korean President, Park, in a United States Senate Committee investigation. With the threat of Park publishing his manuscript on the regime, President Park of South Korea sends Kim Gyu-pyeong, the current KCIA Director to stop Park Yong-gak from publishing his manuscript. Kim goes to Washington, where the two meet and Kim demands the manuscript from Park. Park Yong-gak hands it over but implies the president's corruption by suggesting that President Park is being financially backed by offshore Swiss accounts.

With his mission accomplished, Kim returns to South Korea and consequently, faces conflict with Kwak Sang-cheo, President Park's bodyguard. A wiretapping plot on the president is discovered and Kim becomes suspicious of a professor who is present at the search in the President's office. Through interrogation, Kim finds out that a KCIA agent has acted without orders from him. He sends an agent, Ham Dae-yong, to Paris to further investigate the situation.

In Paris, through means of wiretapping, Ham discovers that the KCIA agent was not acting on his own, but rather under orders from Kwak. Through this, it is discovered that Kwak has ordered the assassination of ex-Director Park, who will be visiting Paris. It is during this time that President Park gives Director Kim the freedom to do what he wishes with the ex-Director. Kim, not to be outdone by Kwak, resolves to have Park Yong-gak killed.

In Paris, two different teams both with the aim of assassinating ex-Director Park prepare to kill him. Kwak's team seeks to lure Park into his room, while Kim's team seeks to kidnap him and then kill him. With the help of Park Yong-gak's aide, Deborah Shim, who is used as bait, Director Kim's team is able to nab ex-Director Park first, driving him out of Paris. However, Park is able to momentarily escape to a nearby town but is tracked down by Ham, who promptly kills him and disposes of his body.

Park is displeased with Kim's handling, however, noting that Kim didn't solve the problem of apparently stolen finances that were procured by Park Yong-gak. Kim's friendship with President Park deteriorates further as a result and Park begins distrusting Kim. Kim, who is deeply torn by the killing, as the ex-Director was his friend, begins to break down under stress.

Sometime after the killing of ex-Director Park, President Park and his administration are faced with a new issue in the form of pro-democracy protests in Busan and Masan, as well as fears that these protests could spread to Seoul. Kwak takes a hardline stance, advising harsh and swift military intervention, and declaration of martial law. Kim suggests a more levelhanded approach and urges Park to avoid declaring martial law. Park, favoring Kwak, proceeds with a declaration of martial law.

Following this, Kim is told that Park is holding a banquet but has not invited him, but rather Kwak. Kim goes anyway to eavesdrop on Park and Kwak and learns that Park is considering replacing Kim. Yet again, Park gives a subordinate clearance to do what they wish, the subordinate this time being Kwak.

On October 26, Park is doing a day of ribbon-cutting ceremonies. Kim attempts to join him and Kwak at the helicopter, but Kwak bars him from joining. Riled, Kim calls his subordinates with the intent of planning something. That night, Park invites Kim to a dinner. It's intended to be an apology of sorts, but Kim is unmoved.
 
During the dinner Kim leaves to get a pistol and meets with his subordinates, and tells them that he will kill Park. Upon returning to the room, the conversation becomes heated. It culminates in Kim shooting and wounding Kwak in the arm. He then turns on Park and shoots him too. As this happens, Kim's subordinates organize a coordinated attack on the compound where the dinner is being held and kill the remaining bodyguards. Kim attempts to finish Kwak, but the pistol jams, and he is forced to leave the room in order to get another gun from an agent. He returns to the room, shooting and killing Kwak and killing Park with a shot to the head.

Kim quickly leaves with his subordinates and the notables present at the compound during the attack. He is given the choice between going to Namsan or the Army Headquarters. The Chief Presidential Secretary, bearing witness to the assassination, suggests that he go to the Army Headquarters. Kim considers this as the screen fades to black. The movie ends with a text saying that Kim chose to drive to the Army Headquarters, where he was caught.

Cast
 Lee Sung-min as President Park: based on Park Chung-hee, the 3rd President of South Korea and father to Park Geun-hye, the 11th President of South Korea
 Lee Byung-hun as Kim Gyu-pyeong: the fictional lead character based on Kim Jae-gyu, who served as the 8th KCIA director from 1976 to 1979
 Kwak Do-won as Park Yong-gak: the character based on Kim Hyong-uk, who served as the 4th KCIA director from 1963 to 1969 
 Lee Hee-joon as Kwak Sang-cheon: the character based on Cha Ji-cheol, who served as the 3rd director of the Presidential Security Service
 Kim So-jin as Debora Shim, a lobbyist 
 Seo Hyun-woo as Chun Doo-hyuk: the character based on Chun Doo-hwan, the 10th KCIA director and the chief of the Defence Security Command, who later became the 5th President of South Korea
 Park Ji-il as Kim Gye-hoon : the character based on Kim Gye-won, the 5th KCIA director, who served as the 18th Chief of Staff of the Republic of Korea Army
 Kim Min-Sang as Jang Seung-ho : the character based on Jeong Seung-hwa, who served as the 22nd Chief of Staff of the Republic of Korea Army
 Park Seong-geun as Kang Chang-soo : the character based on Park Heung-joo, a KCIA officer and Army colonel 
 Ji Hyun-jun as Ham Dae-yong, a KCIA agent 
 Eric Bernard as the French Henchman

Reception

Critical reception

Awards and nominations

See also
 List of submissions to the 93rd Academy Awards for Best International Feature Film
 List of South Korean submissions for the Academy Award for Best International Feature Film

References

External links 
 
 

2020 films
2020s political thriller films
2020s Korean-language films
South Korean political films
South Korean films based on actual events
Films set in 1979
Films set in the 1970s
Films set in Seoul
Films set in Paris
Films set in Washington, D.C.
Films shot in Seoul
Films about coups d'état
Films about intelligence agencies